William Mackie Douglas (6 June 1903 – 5 July 1981) was a New Zealand sportsman. He played 12 first-class cricket matches for Otago between 1922 and 1929.

Douglas was born at Dunedin in 1903 and educated at Otago Boys' High School. He worked as a grocer. As well as cricket, Douglas played association football for Otago.

References

External links
 

1903 births
1981 deaths
New Zealand cricketers
Otago cricketers
Cricketers from Dunedin